The List of British athletics champions (outdoors) covers four competitions: the current British Athletics Championships which was founded in 2007, the preceding AAA Championships which existed from 1880 until 2006, the Amateur Athletic Club Championships (1866-1879) and finally and the UK Athletics Championships which existed from 1977 until 1997 and ran concurrently with the AAA Championships.

Past winners
List of British champions in 60 metres
List of British champions in 100 metres
List of British champions in 200 metres
List of British champions in 400 metres
List of British champions in 800 metres
List of British champions in 1,500 metres
List of British champions in 3,000 metres
List of British champions in 5,000 metres
List of British champions in 10,000 metres
List of British champions in 10 miles
List of British champions in marathon
List of British champions in 3,000 metres steeplechase
List of British champions in 100/110 metres hurdles
List of British champions in 200 metres hurdles
List of British champions in 400 metres hurdles
List of British champions in 3,000 metres walk
List of British champions in 5,000 metres walk
List of British champions in 10,000 metres walk
List of British champions in decathlon/heptathlon
List of British champions in discus
List of British champions in hammer
List of British champions in high jump
List of British champions in javelin
List of British champions in long jump
List of British champions in pole vault
List of British champions in shot put
List of British champions in triple jump

References

British Athletics Championships